Du Xing is a fictional character in Water Margin, one of the Four Great Classical Novels of Chinese literature. Nicknamed "Demon Face", he ranks 89th among the 108 Stars of Destiny and 53rd among the 72 Earthly Fiends.

Background
Du Xing, a native of Zhongshan Prefecture (中山府; around present-day Dingzhou, Hebei), is nicknamed "Demon Face" due to his ugly look. When doing business in Jizhou (薊州; around present-day Ji County, Tianjin), he kills a partner in a heated quarrel and is jailed. Fortunately the chief warden Yang Xiong helps to get him freed.

Zhu Family Village
After killing his adulteress wife at Mount Cuiping, Yang Xiong decides to join the outlaws at Liangshan Marsh with his sworn brother Shi Xiu. The burglar and tomb raider Shi Qian, who happened upon the killing, asks to go with them. On the way, the three eat in an inn belonging to the Zhu Family Manor.  They get into a fray with the innkeeper after Shi Qian, finding the inn's food not appetising, stole its only rooster and cooked it for meal. As they run away pursued by men fetched by the innkeeper, Shi Qian is captured in a trap. Yang and Shi stumble into the neighbouring Li Family Manor, where they run into Du Xing when he is at an inn buying wine. As Yang Xiong is his benefactor, Du Xing, now the butler of Li Ying, the head of Li Family Manor, asks his master to appeal to the Zhus to release Shi Qian.

Li Ying writes a polite letter to the Zhu family requesting that they let Shi Qian go. Rebuffed by the Zhus, Li Ying assumes they reckoned he was not serious and sends Du Xing, his top servant, to personally deliver another letter. This time the Zhus tear up the letter and verbally insult Li Ying for associating himself with bandits. Shocked, Du Xing reports the aspersions to his master. Li is enraged and goes to confront the Zhus, taking some of his men. But he is wounded in the arm by an arrow shot by Zhu Biao. Luckily he is saved by Yang Xiong and Shi Xiu. Yang and Shi continue their way to Liangshan, where they mention Shi Qian and ask the outlaws to help rescue him. After three military offensives, Song Jiang eventually exterminates the Zhu Family Village.

Joining Liangshan
Keen to recruit Li Ying and Du Xing, Song Jiang carries out a plan in which Xiao Rang and a few others pose as government officials to arrest the two for  "collaborating" with Liangshan. As Li and Du are being "escorted" to the county office, the outlaws intercept the convoy to "rescue" them. Taken to the stronghold, Li Ying has no choice but joins Liangshan. Du Xing follows his master.

Campaigns
Du Xing is placed in charge of an inn which acts as a lookout for Liangshan after the 108 Stars of Destiny came together in what is called the Grand Assembly. He participates in the campaigns against the Liao invaders and rebel forces in Song territory following amnesty from Emperor Huizong for Liangshan.

Du Xing is one of the few Liangshan heroes who survive all the campaigns. Although conferred the title "Martial Gentleman of Grace" and given an official position, he resigns from it when Li Ying quits his. The two return to the Li Family Manor where they lead a comfortable life.

References
 
 
 
 
 
 
 

72 Earthly Fiends
Fictional characters from Hebei